ABPS may refer to:

Aditya Birla Public School, Renukoot, Uttar Pradesh, India
Advanced Bio Prosthetic Surfaces 
American Baptist Publication Society
American Board of Physician Specialties
American Board of Plastic Surgery
American Board of Podiatric Surgery
Associated Fellow of the British Psychological Society
Associate Member of the Bangladesh Photographic Society
Association of British Philatelic Societies

See also
ABP (disambiguation)